This is a list of newspapers in Serbia.

Daily newspapers

Local weekly newspapers
Kragujevačke novine (Kragujevac) 
Subotičke novine (Subotica)
Pančevac (Pančevo)
 Čačanski glas (Čačak)
Napred (Valjevo)
Glas Podrinja (Šabac)
Užička nedelja (Užice)
Somborske novine (Sombor)
Timočke (Bor)
Vranjske (Vranje)
Borski problem (Bor)
Kikindske (Kikinda) 
Zrenjanin (Zrenjanin)

Minority language newspapers
Magyar Szó (Hungarian language) daily (Subotica)
Hlas ľudu (Slovak language) weekly (Novi Sad)
Hrvatska riječ (Croatian language) weekly (Subotica)
Zvonik  (Croatian language) monthly (Subotica)
Miroljub (Croatian language) quarterly (Sombor)
Libertatea (Romanian language) weekly (Pančevo)
Novo bratstvo (Bulgarian language) weekly (Dimitrovgrad)
Ruske Slovo (Pannonian Rusyn language) (Novi Sad)
Bunjevačke novine (Bunjevac speech) monthly (Subotica)

Defunct dailies
Balkan ekspres (1990–1993, Belgrade)
Slobodna Šumadija (1994, Kragujevac)
Građanin (1997, Belgrade)
Naša borba (1994–1998, Belgrade)
Demokratija (1996–1998, Belgrade)
Dnevni telegraf (1996–1999, Belgrade)
NT Plus (1996–2000, Belgrade)
Nacional (2001–2003, Belgrade)
Centar (2003-2004, Belgrade)
Balkan (2003–2005, Belgrade)
Internacional (2003–2005, Belgrade)
Ekipa (2005, Belgrade)
Politika Ekspres (1963–2005, Belgrade)
Srpski nacional (2005–2006, Belgrade)
Opozicija (2006, Belgrade)
Start (2005–2006, Belgrade)
Sutra (2007–2008, Belgrade)
Kurir Sport (2007–2008, Belgrade)
Gazeta (2007–2008, Belgrade)
Biznis (2007–2008, Belgrade)
Borba (1922–2009, Belgrade)
Glas javnosti (1998–2010, Belgrade)
Građanski list (2000–2010, Novi Sad)
Press (2005–2012, Belgrade)
Pravda (2007–2012, Belgrade)
San (2012–2013, Belgrade)
Naše novine (2013–2015, Belgrade)
Sport (1945–2016, Belgrade)
24 sata (2006–2017, Belgrade)

References 

Serbia

Newspapers